Choi Seung-Ho is identified as a Korean ecopoet. His publications also include children's poetry. He was born in the small rural village of Chungcheong, Gangwon Province, in 1954, and taught for many years in an elementary school in the countryside.

In 2004, the Daesan Foundation sponsored him and other writers in fora in Mexico and Cuba. In 2007, the Korea Literature Translation Institute sponsored him at ARCO in Malaga City, Spain.

Work
Choi's work focuses on the environment and modern society's impact on it, in particular, the crisis brought on by rapid industrialization and the consequent vulgarization of human life in a capitalistic society. Choi uses images of “waste”—basements, drains, and toilets filled with waste material and the rank smell emanating from them to symbolize the corruption dominating urban landscape. Despite such offensive images, the tone of his poetry remains thoughtful and meditative and the poet never descends to vulgar word play. He looks upon the corrupt world with the metaphysical awareness of a Buddhist monk.

Buddhism and Taoism have been influential in the formation of Lee's poetic sensibility. As an aspiring poet, he often immersed himself in intense contemplation of a chosen topic to increase concentration and mental clarity. The mental pain that accompanies such intellectual exercises has burnt itself into his face. To his credit, his poetry does not flaunt an overtly religious tone although his fervor is that of a religious disciple.

Although Choi has stated that he seeks to merge “The Way of Poetry” and “the Way of Truth,” he does not identify poetry as the truth itself, but rather as a process of reaching the truth. From the critique of urban vulgarity and secular desires, Choi's poetry has evolved to a philosophical exploration of the origin of all creation. In more recent prose poems he applies his powers of close observation to suggest  compassionate contemplation as a remedy:

Works in translation
 Flowers in the Toilet Bowl: Selected Poems of Choi Seungho, Paramus NJ 2004
 A selection in Cracking the Shell: Three Korean Eco-poets, Paramus NJ 2006
 Autobiographie aus Eis (얼음의 자서전)

Works in Korean (partial)
 Poetry Collections
 Snow Storm Warning (1983)
 Hedgehog Village (1985)
 Riding a Mud Ox (1987)
 The Pleasure of Secular City (1990)
 The Night of Gangrenes (1993)
 Firefly Preservation Area (1995)
 Snowman (1996)
 Grotesque (1999)
 Sandman (2000)
 I Am Everything Though Nothing (2003).

References

1954 births
20th-century South Korean poets
Living people
21st-century South Korean poets
South Korean male poets
Midang Literary Award winners
20th-century male writers
21st-century male writers